Charles Small Pybus (1766–1810) was an English barrister and politician.

Life
He was the second son of the banker John Pybus and his wife Martha Small, born 3 November 1766, in the East Indies. He was educated in at Harrow School. He matriculated at St John's College, Cambridge in 1781, and in the same year entered Lincoln's Inn. He entered the Inner Temple in 1784, graduated B.A. in 1786 and M.A. in 1789 at Cambridge, and was called to the bar in 1789.

He impressed William Pitt the younger with early parliamentary speeches: others found him vain and pretentious. He became a Lord of the Admiralty in 1791, and then a Lord of the Treasury from 1797. He held his seat until 1802. He died unmarried on 5 September 1810.

Notes

1766 births
1810 deaths
People educated at Harrow School
Alumni of St John's College, Cambridge
Members of Lincoln's Inn
Members of the Inner Temple
Members of the Parliament of Great Britain for Dover
Members of the Parliament of the United Kingdom for Dover
British MPs 1796–1800
British MPs 1790–1796
UK MPs 1801–1802
Lords of the Admiralty